Gargela niphostola is a moth in the family Crambidae. It was described by George Hampson in 1917. It is found on Fergusson Island in Papua New Guinea.

References

Crambinae
Moths described in 1917
Moths of New Guinea